Deh-e Kafi (also Romanized as Deh-e Kāfī) is a village in Derakhtengan Rural District, in the Central District of Kerman County, Kerman Province, Iran. At the 2006 census, its population was 22, in 5 families.

References 

Populated places in Kerman County